is a Japanese former sports shooter. He competed in the 25 metre pistol event at the 1960 Summer Olympics and 1962 Asian Games.

References

External links
  

1927 births
Possibly living people
Japanese male sport shooters
Olympic shooters of Japan
Shooters at the 1960 Summer Olympics
Sportspeople from Hiroshima
Asian Games medalists in shooting
Shooters at the 1962 Asian Games
Asian Games gold medalists for Japan
Medalists at the 1962 Asian Games
20th-century Japanese people